The Minister of State at the Department of the Taoiseach is a junior ministerial post in the Department of the Taoiseach of the Government of Ireland who performs duties and functions delegated by the Taoiseach.

The position was first created in 1922 as Parliamentary secretary to the President of the Executive Council. In 1937, following the adoption of the Constitution of Ireland, the position was changed to that of Parliamentary Secretary to the Taoiseach. In 1978, the position was superseded by the office of Minister of State at the Department of the Taoiseach.

One of the Ministers of State in this department is assigned the role of Government Chief Whip and is the most senior Minister of State in the Government of Ireland. They attend cabinet meetings, but do not have a vote and are not one of fifteen members of the government. The role of the Whip is primarily that of the disciplinarian for all government parties, to ensure that all deputies, including ministers, attend for Dáil Business and follow the government line on all issues.

The incumbent Government Chief Whip is Hildegarde Naughton, TD, and the Deputy Chief Whip is Cormac Devlin.

Responsibilities of Government Chief Whip
The main responsibilities of the Chief Whip include:

Attendance at Government meetings
The Chief Whip is a Minister of State who attends Government meetings, but does not have a vote. The title is sometimes given as "Minister of State, attending Government". Other Ministers of state with the title "Minister of State, attending Government" are commonly known as Super Junior Ministers.

Preparation of weekly brief for Taoiseach on legislation in preparation
Before each Dáil Session letters are sent to all Ministers to see what legislation or other business their Department expects to place before the Dáil. A weekly report on what stage Bills are at is given to the Taoiseach. During the Order of Business the Taoiseach is often queried about what legislation is promised. The weekly report shows what Bills are promised and gives an expected date of publication of the Bill.

Scheduling and monitoring of Dáil business
Once a Bill has been published and is placed on the Dáil Order Paper the staff in the Whip's Office keep in touch with Minister's Private Secretaries about when they wish to have their bill taken in the Dáil - sometimes the Whip's Office have to insist that a Bill is taken on a certain day, particularly when there is not much business for the House. Every Wednesday the Private Secretary prepares an agenda (called a schedule - see example) for each sitting day of the following week. This is discussed at a meeting of the Dáil Business Committee, which includes the Whips of the major parties, including the government (Fine Gael) chief whip; Fianna Fáil whip Michael Moynihan; Sinn Féin whip Aengus Ó Snodaigh and Labour Party whip Brendan Ryan.

Operation of the pairing system
A pair is an arrangement whereby a Government Deputy's name is linked with an Opposition Deputy in the event of a Vote arising. The practice is that under such an arrangement neither Deputy votes in any Division arising while the pairing agreement is valid. Because it is obviously so important for the Government to maintain its majority in the Dáil Chamber the pairing arrangements must be attended to very carefully. If a member cannot attend a notice explaining their absence must be sent to the Chief Whip as early as possible.

Leinster House accommodation for political parties
The Minister has to ensure that facilities and services in Leinster House are satisfactory for members and staff. The Opposition Whips liaise with him on matters such as office equipment which they may require.

Chairing Legislation Committee
The Chief Whip chairs the weekly meeting of the Legislation Committee. This Committee meets to discuss the progress of Bills in Departments and tries to ensure that there is always enough business for the Dáil and Seanad. The meeting is attended by the Attorney General, a Parliamentary Draftsman, Programme Manager to the Taoiseach, Programme Manager to the Tánaiste, Principal Officer in this Department (who looks after legislation) and the Chief Whip.

List of Government Chief Whips

Other Ministers of State at the Department of the Taoiseach 1986–present

References

Taoiseach
Department of the Taoiseach